Eriogonum inflatum, the desert trumpet, is a perennial plant of the family Polygonaceae. The plant possesses very small yellow or pink flowers and an inflated stem just below branching segments.  Eriogonum: from the Greek erion, "wool", and gonu, "joint or knee", in reference to the hairy or woolly joints of some of the species of the genus, but not particularly inflatum. It is found in the Mojave Desert and other deserts.

Stems
The swelling of the stems was assumed to have been influenced by the presence of gall insects, most notably of the genus Odynerus. The female wasp produces a small hole on the inflated portion of the desert trumpet, packs the cavity with larvae and lays her eggs upon them, providing a food source, and a protected environment for the offspring. Irritation caused by this process was said to have enlarged the cavity over time. Recently, research performed by a world authority on the genus Eriogonum, Dr. J. L. Reveal of the University of Maryland, College Park, revealed the swollen stem of Eriogonum inflatum is due to high concentrations of carbon dioxide in the solid stem and seems to be related to gas regulation.

Some insects utilize the swollen stem as a larder, but the inflation is not caused by the larval feeding of gall insects.

Uses
It is known that some Native American tribes that once inhabited the surrounding areas of the Las Vegas Valley (most commonly Paiute) would remove the stalk of E. inflatum at the base, and then cut the inflated bulb in half, producing a makeshift pipe. A mixture of Indian tobacco and mistletoe would be smoked primarily for leisure purposes.

This plant makes a brief appearance in Star Trek: Voyager, in Season 3, episode 1, at around the 3 minute 47 second mark, when the character "Neelix" is shown to be looking at a picked specimen.

External links 

UC Jepson Manual treatment - Eriogonum inflatum
One of the Oddest Flowers: Desert Trumpet

inflatum
Flora of the Southwestern United States
Flora of the Great Basin
Flora of the California desert regions
Flora of the Sonoran Deserts
Death Valley National Park
Flora without expected TNC conservation status